Vai is a Unicode block containing characters of the Vai syllabary used for writing the Vai language of Sierra Leone and Liberia.

Block

History
The following Unicode-related documents record the purpose and process of defining specific characters in the Vai block:

References 

Unicode blocks
Vai language